The California Academy of Tauromaquia is a school of instruction for toreo, or Spanish style bullfighting, based in San Diego. Founded in 1996 by Coleman Cooney, it describes itself as the first school of its kind in the United States. The academy is dedicated to providing instruction in the art and craft of toreo to people from outside the taurine culture.

The school has enjoyed considerable success, training people of all ages and from around the world in the discipline of tauromaquia, and has been featured in over 200 publications worldwide.

References

External links
California Academy of Tauromaquia

Bullfighting schools
1996 establishments in California